Valentina Marchei (born 23 May 1986) is an Italian retired pair and single figure skater. As a singles skater, she is a five-time Italian national champion (2004, 2008, 2010, 2012, 2014). Her highest ISU Championship placements were 4th at the 2013 European Championships and 8th at the 2012 World Championships. She represented Italy at the 2014 Winter Olympics and placed 11th. Also, Marchei competed as a pair skater with Ondřej Hotárek, representing Italy. The pair finished 6th at the 2018 Winter Olympics.

Personal life 
Valentina Marchei was born 23 May 1986 in Milan, Italy. She is the daughter of Marco Marchei, a competitor in the marathon at the 1980 and 1984 Olympics. Her early interests were speed skating and gymnastics. She studied with a focus on sport at university and has worked as a reporter for Italian television.

Career in singles 
Marchei began skating in 1993. She was coached by Cristina Mauri from the age of nine.

Ahead of the 2007–08 season, Marchei spent the first part of July training with Viktor Kudriavtsev in Flims, Switzerland. She trained in Courchevel in the remainder of July and August and then Paris and Milan in the winter, coached by Pierre Trente and Cristina Mauri. Marchei injured her knee in September 2007.

In September 2008, Marchei began working with Nikolai Morozov in Hackensack, New Jersey. She missed most of the 2008–09 season after injuring her right ankle on a triple Lutz at 2008 Skate America. Marchei did not receive any Grand Prix invitations in 2009–10. She finished 8th at the 2010 European Championships. In 2010–11, Marchei returned to the Grand Prix series, competing at 2010 Skate Canada International and 2010 Cup of Russia. She was 10th at the 2011 European Championships.

In 2011, Marchei changed coaches to Jason Dungjen and Yuka Sato in Detroit. She had ankle and knee injuries in 2011. She finished 8th at the 2012 World Championships in Nice, France. Marchei represented Italy at the 2014 Winter Olympics, where she placed 11th. In September 2014, she withdrew from both of her Grand Prix assignments, the 2014 Skate Canada International and 2014 Rostelecom Cup.

Career in pairs 
On 2 July 2014, La Gazzetta dello Sport wrote that Marchei and Ondřej Hotárek were considering skating as a pair. Bruno Marcotte confirmed on 26 July 2014 that the two were training together. They are coached by Marcotte in Montreal and by Franca Bianconi in Milan. On 6 August 2014, Marchei sprained the medial collateral ligament of her right knee. On 8 September, she said she would resume light on-ice training in a few days. Commenting on her switch to pairs, Marchei stated: "At the beginning practicing pairs was just to do shows or stuff like that, but then it was something that got to me. It's crazy. I still do single programs at shows, but it is strange, I'm looking around, where is he?"

Marchei/Hotárek won the Italian national title in December 2014. In January 2015, they placed fourth at the European Championships in Stockholm, Sweden and 11th at the World Championships in March.

On 16 September 2018 Marchei announced the end of her partnership with Hotárek via Instagram.

On 1 September 2020, two years after she last competed, Marchei announced her retirement via Facebook, citing that she considered returning, if not for the ongoing pandemic.

Programs

With Hotárek

Single skating

Competitive highlights 
GP: Grand Prix; CS: Challenger Series; JGP: Junior Grand Prix

Pairs with Hotárek

Ladies' singles

Detailed results

With Hotarek

References

External links 

 
 

Italian female single skaters
Italian female pair skaters
Figure skaters at the 2007 Winter Universiade
1986 births
Living people
Figure skaters from Milan
Medalists at the 2007 Winter Universiade
Figure skaters at the 2014 Winter Olympics
Figure skaters at the 2018 Winter Olympics
Olympic figure skaters of Italy
Universiade medalists in figure skating
Universiade silver medalists for Italy